Germán José González (born March 7, 1962 in Río Caribe, Sucre State, Venezuela) is a former Major League Baseball relief pitcher who played for the Minnesota Twins (1988–89). He batted and threw right-handed.

In a two-season career, González compiled a 3–2 record with 44 strikeouts and a 4.41 ERA in 50.1 innings.

See also
 List of players from Venezuela in Major League Baseball

References

External links
, or Retrosheet, or Pura Pelota (Venezuelan Winter League)

1962 births
Living people
Kenosha Twins players
Major League Baseball pitchers
Major League Baseball players from Venezuela
Minnesota Twins players
Minor league baseball coaches
Orlando Twins players
People from Sucre (state)
Portland Beavers players
Tigres de Aragua players
Venezuelan baseball coaches
Venezuelan expatriate baseball players in the United States